Ovbokha Agboyi (born 14 December 1994) is a Nigerian footballer who plays as a midfielder. He was a member of Nigeria U20 at the 2013 FIFA U-20 World Cup, where he played in all four games.

References

External links
 
 Ovbokha Agboyi at Nogometna zveza Slovenije 

1994 births
Living people
People from Abuja
Nigerian footballers
Nigeria under-20 international footballers
Association football midfielders
Abuja F.C. players
KF Skënderbeu Korçë players
KF Elbasani players
NK Zavrč players
NK Bravo players
Kategoria Superiore players
Slovenian PrvaLiga players
Slovenian Second League players
Nigerian expatriate footballers
Expatriate footballers in Albania
Nigerian expatriate sportspeople in Albania
Expatriate footballers in Slovenia
Nigerian expatriate sportspeople in Slovenia